This is a list of publications of the Conservative Monday Club, a prominent Tory political pressure-group in the United Kingdom.

Booklets

 A Personal Record, (of rejection of socialism, &c.,) by John Braine, December 1968.
 Ireland - Our Cuba? by Jeremy Harwood, the Hon. Jonathan Guinness, & John Biggs-Davison, M.P. 1970 
 Capital - Yours or Theirs?, by the Club's Taxation Group, Chairman: A. P. Leslie, February 1970.
 Rents - Chaos or Commonsense?, by Horace Cutler 1970. 
 Standing Room Only - The Population Problem in Britain, by Geoffrey Baber. 1971.
 Some Uncivil Liberties by Cllr.Sam Swerling. 1971.
 Education and the Permissive Society, by Clive Buckmaster, early 1970s 
 ''Europe's Back Door: The Soviet Maritime Threat, by Patrick Wall, M.P., early 1970s. . 1973 
 The Enemies Within, by Comdr. Anthony T. Courtney, O.B.E.,R.N.,(Retd).,(M.P., for Harrow East (UK Parliament constituency) 1959-1966), with a foreword by the Hon. Jonathan Guinness. 1972.
 The Crooked Conscience - Are the Churches Politically 'Bent'?, by Bernard Smith. 1972.
 Who's Getting at Our Kids?, by Cllr.Sam Swerling. . 1972.
 State & Economy - Need for a Tory Rethink, by the Club's Economic Policy Group. . 1972.
 When the Bough Breaks, John Peter Preece Smith,  circa 1973.
 Thoughts on Defence, by Anthony Courtney, M.P., for Harrow East, 1959-1966], David Pilleau, & Peter Langley. July 1974.
 Local Rates, by Cllr.Brian Costello, mid-1970s.
 Towards a Solution, by Julian Amery, M.P., 1975.
 Rhodesia & The Threat to The West, by the Rt.Hon. Julian Amery, M.P., John Biggs-Davison, M.P., Harold Soref (former M.P.) and Patrick Wall, M.C., M.P. 1976.
 Europe - The Unguarded Legacy, by John Young & the Club's European Policy Group, with a foreword by the Rt.Hon. Julian Amery, M.P., and introduction by John Biggs-Davison, M.P. 1978.
 Who's Afraid of Laissez Faire?, by David Hart, 1980. .
 The Price of Peace, by Brian Crozier, 1980 [Club were distributors only]
 Communist Propaganda Apparatus & Other Threats to The Media by Sir James Goldsmith – a booklet containing his statement to the Media Committee of the Conservative Party at the House of Commons, 21 January 1981. [Club were distributors only].
 Immigration, Repatriation, & the C.R.E., by K. Harvey Proctor, M.P., John R. Pinniger, M.A., with a foreword by Sir Ronald Bell, Q.C., M.P. 1981.
 The Conservative Party & The Common Market, by David Storey & Teddy Taylor, M.P. July 1982.
 Recall to Greatness, by John Murray, mid-1980s.
 The Preservation of The House of Lords, by the Rt.Hon.The Lord Sudeley, with a foreword by Sir John Stokes, M.P. 1991.House of Lords (PDF)

Other publications

 "The Challenger" journal of the Scottish Monday Club
 "Right Hook", quarterly journal of the Young Monday Club. Editor in Spring 1979 was Eleanor Dodd.
 "Tory News", occasional newsletter
 "Tory Challenge" quarterly journal of the National Monday Club. Editor in 1980 was Clive Buckmaster.
 "Monday World", glossy magazine, (editorial board in 1981: Eleanor Dodd (editor), Cllr.Sam Swerling (former editor), David Storey, John R. Pinniger, Graham Mather, John de Vere Walker).
 "Monday News" quarterly newsletter (editor in November 1981 was Eleanor Dodd).
 "Right Ahead" 'Conservative & Unionist' occasional newspaper, notably the annual Conservative Party Conference editions. The Summer 1986 edition carries and impressive line-up of writers of whom many are M.P.s. The 1985 editorial board consisted of: David Storey (editor, and Club chairman), Cedric Gunnery (a Club co-founder, Director, & Treasurer), George Gardiner, MP, and Teddy Taylor, MP.
 "Monday Club News" regular newsletter, 1989 on, edited by Gregory Lauder-Frost (1989-1992).

See also

Notes

Conservative political advocacy groups in the United Kingdom
Monday Club
Monday Club publications